Ishbara Tolis was the ruler of Western Turkic Khaganate (empire) between 634–639. His full title was Shābōluō xìlìshī (~diélìshī) kèhán 沙钵罗咥利失可汗, personal name Ashina Tong-e 阿史那同俄).

Reign 
He was Bagha Shad's son. After his elder brother Duolu Qaghan abdicated, he was enthroned in 634 in very unfavorable circumstances. He had to rely on vassal tribes which were more powerful than himself. In 635, he sent arrows to ten tribes which meant legitimatizing them as shads (semi independent governor princes), but he was careful to keep the delicate balance between the two rival factions by appointing five from Duolu and five from Nushibi. Thus his empire came to be known as Onoq, meaning "ten arrows" (十箭).) Even this policy however, wasn't successful. A noble named Tun Tudun revolted and caused khagan to flee to Qarasahr with his brother Böri Shad. However, he was reinstalled to throne by Nushibi noble Esegel Kul-Erkin who killed Tun Tudun. Meanwhile Duolu tribes appointed Yukuk Shad a prince from the recently collapsed Eastern Turkic Khaganate as their ruler.

Later reign 
After the Duolu–Nushibi split of 683, he spent rest of his life among his former Nushibi subjects, east to Ili River. He was killed by one of his own men in 659, on orders of Yukuk Shad.

References

7th-century Turkic people
Ashina house of the Turkic Empire
Göktürk khagans
Year of birth unknown
Year of death missing